The Charles Rice Ames House is a historic residence in the city of Belpre, Ohio, United States.  Built in 1843 in the Greek Revival style of architecture, the house has been named the region's most outstanding Greek Revival structure.

Charles Rice Ames contracted with local builder Daniel Fischer to construct his house in the 1840s.  Fischer's design was a two-story structure, built on a foundation of sandstone, a slate roof, and frame walls.  The floor plan of the residence is composed of a rectangular central section, plus wings on each side that project  from the center.  Among the distinctive architectural features of the house are pediments and gables on the facade.  Years after serving as Ames' home, the house was owned by Roger and Carol Lynn Patton.

In 1978, the Ames House was listed on the National Register of Historic Places, qualifying for the Register because of its historic architecture, which was seen as significant throughout the local area.  It is one of four Belpre locations on the Register, along with the Sixth Street Railroad Bridge, the Captain Jonathan Stone House, and Spencer's Landing.

References

External links

Houses completed in 1843
Greek Revival houses in Ohio
Houses on the National Register of Historic Places in Ohio
Houses in Washington County, Ohio
National Register of Historic Places in Washington County, Ohio
1843 establishments in Ohio
Wooden houses in the United States
Belpre, Ohio